Robbie Ward is an English rugby league footballer who plays as a  for the Sheffield Eagles in the Betfred Championship.

Career
Ward made his senior début for Leeds on 23 May 2014 in a Super League match against Hull F.C. Overall, he played eleven times for the club in 2014 and 2015, scoring two tries. Ward was released by Leeds at the end of 2015. During 2015, he was dual registered with the Hunslet Hawks in the Championship and played five times for the club, scoring one try.

After departing Leeds he moved to Australia where he signed for the Sunshine Coast Falcons in the Queensland Cup, but moved back to England part way through the season signing for Featherstone Rovers. In September 2016 he signed for the Dewsbury Rams.

In Autumn 2019, Ward signed a 2year deal with the Sheffield Eagles.

References

External links

1995 births
Living people
Dewsbury Rams players
English rugby league players
Featherstone Rovers players
Hunslet R.L.F.C. players
Leeds Rhinos players
Rugby league hookers
Sheffield Eagles players